The Republic of Alba was a short-lived state that existed from 10 October to 2 November 1944 in Alba, northern Italy, as a local resistance against Italian fascism during World War II, and which was part of the so-called Italian Partisan Republics, the first of which was the Republic of Corniolo. It was named after the Napoleonic Republic of Alba that existed in 1796 in Piedmont.

Occupation of Alba
On October 10th, 1944,  partisans occupied the city almost without conflict since the fascist contingents under  had abandoned the city following negotiations with the partisans mediated by the Curia. The partisans were mostly from Alpini divisions lead by Enrico Martini.

The partisan government
Command of the city was assumed by Carletto Morelli, while the civil administration continued under chosen local officials.

The fascist counterattack

Fascist troops gathered at Bra and Pollenzo with reinforcements from Turin. They attempted to reach Tanaro by ford after October 24th but were repulsed, suffering 11 casualties including their commanding officer.

Quotes

See also 
Italian Partisan Republics
Italian resistance movement

References

1944 in Italy
Republic of Alba (1944)
Modern history of Italy
Italian states
States and territories established in 1944
States and territories disestablished in 1944
History of Piedmont
1944 establishments in Europe
1944 disestablishments in Europe
Italian resistance movement
Italian partisan republics